The 25th People's Choice Awards, honoring the best in popular culture for 1998, were held on January 10, 1999, at the Pasadena Civic Auditorium in Pasadena, California. They were hosted by Ray Romano, and broadcast on CBS.

Awards
Winners are listed first, in bold.

References

External links
1999 People's Choice.com

People's Choice Awards
1999 awards in the United States
1999 in California
January 1999 events in the United States